The Captain Hammond House is a historic house located at 5775 Citrus Avenue in White City, Florida. It was built for and served as the home for the retired New England sea captain John Hammond.

Description and history 
The house itself was completed in 1902 and was built by Danish craftsman in the Frame Vernacular style influenced by Danish architectural styles. On February 23, 1990, it was added to the U.S. National Register of Historic Places.

References

External links
 St. Lucie County listings at National Register of Historic Places
  at 

Danish-American culture
Houses on the National Register of Historic Places in Florida
National Register of Historic Places in St. Lucie County, Florida
Houses in St. Lucie County, Florida
Vernacular architecture in Florida
Houses completed in 1902